{{DISPLAYTITLE:C7H5ClO}}
The molecular formula C7H5ClO may refer to:

 Benzoyl chloride
 Chlorobenzaldehydes
 2-Chlorobenzaldehyde (o-chlorobenzaldehyde)
 3-Chlorobenzaldehyde (m-chlorobenzaldehyde)
 4-Chlorobenzaldehyde (p-chlorobenzaldehyde)